Velké Popovice is a municipality and village in Prague-East District in the Central Bohemian Region of the Czech Republic. It has about 3,100 inhabitants.

Administrative parts
Villages of Brtnice, Dub, Dubiny, Klenové, Krámský, Křivá Ves, Lojovice, Mokřany and Řepčice are administrative parts of Velké Popovice.

Geography
It lies in the Benešov Uplands. The Mokřanský Stream flows through the municipality and together with several nameless tributaries supplies several ponds in the territory.

History

The first written mention of Velké Popovice is from 1332.

Economy
Velké Popovice is known mostly for the production of the Velkopopovický Kozel beer. The beer brewing in Velké Popovice was first documented in the 16th century and the current brewery was founded in 1874.

Sights
The Church of Our Lady of the Snows is the main landmark of Velké Popovice. It was probably founded in the 13th century and its current form is from the 17th century.

References

External links

Villages in Prague-East District